The Big Ask (originally titled Teddy Bears) is a 2013 American comedy drama film directed by Thomas Beatty and Rebecca Fishman. It stars Gillian Jacobs, Zachary Knighton, David Krumholtz, Melanie Lynskey, Ahna O'Reilly, and Jason Ritter. The film was released theatrically on May 20, 2014.

Synopsis
Three couples head to the desert to support their friend (Krumholtz) after the death of his mother, but there's fallout amidst the group when his intentions become clear: he wants to sleep with each of his best friends’ girlfriends—at the same time.

Cast
Gillian Jacobs as Emily
Zachary Knighton as Dave
David Krumholtz as Andrew
Melanie Lynskey as Hannah
Ahna O'Reilly as Zoe
Jason Ritter as Owen
Dale Dickey as Lori
French Stewart as Rich
Ned Beatty as Old Man Carl

Release
The film premiered at the Seattle International Film Festival on June 1, 2013, under its original title. It began a limited theatrical release on May 20, 2014.

Reception
The Big Ask has a 58% approval rating on Rotten Tomatoes. Some critics felt that the film wasted the potential of its unusual premise, but others praised the writing and performances, particularly by Lynskey.

References

External links
 

2013 films
2013 comedy films
American comedy films
2010s English-language films
2010s American films